Iris albicans, also known as the cemetery iris, white cemetery iris, or the white flag iris, is a species of iris which was planted on graves in Muslim regions and grows in many countries throughout the Middle East and northern Africa. It was later introduced to Spain, and then other European countries. It is a natural hybrid.

It grows to 30–60 cm tall. The leaves are grey-green, and broadly sword-shaped. The inflorescence is fan-shaped and contains two or three fragrant flowers. The flowers are grey or silvery in bud, and are white or off-white and 8 cm wide in bloom. It is a sterile hybrid, and spreads by rhizomal growth and division, as it cannot produce seeds.

Iris albicans has been cultivated since ancient times and may be the oldest iris in cultivation. Collected by Lange in 1860, it has been in cultivation since at least 1400 BC. Originating from Yemen and Saudi Arabia, it appears in a wall painting of the Botanical Garden of Tuthmosis III in the Temple of Amun at Karnak in ancient Thebes dated around 1426 BC.

Iris albicans is included in the Tasmanian Fire Service's list of low flammability plants, indicating that it is suitable for growing within a building protection zone.

References

albicans
Flora of Saudi Arabia
Flora of Yemen
Garden plants of Asia
Hybrid plants